Taylor Creek Township is one of the fifteen townships of Hardin County, Ohio, United States. As of the 2010 census the population was 521.

Geography
Located in the southern part of the county, it borders the following townships:
Buck Township - northeast
Hale Township - east
Bokes Creek Township, Logan County - southeast
Rushcreek Township, Logan County - south
Richland Township, Logan County - southwest
Lynn Township - west
McDonald Township - northwest

No municipalities are located in Taylor Creek Township.

Name and history
Taylor Creek Township was organized around 1833. This township was named for James Taylor, Jr., an officer in the War of 1812. It is the only Taylor Creek Township statewide, although there is a Taylor Township in Union County.

Government
The township is governed by a three-member board of trustees, who are elected in November of odd-numbered years to a four-year term beginning on the following January 1. Two are elected in the year after the presidential election and one is elected in the year before it. There is also an elected township fiscal officer, who serves a four-year term beginning on April 1 of the year after the election, which is held in November of the year before the presidential election. Vacancies in the fiscal officership or on the board of trustees are filled by the remaining trustees.

References

External links
County website

Townships in Hardin County, Ohio
Townships in Ohio
1833 establishments in Ohio
Populated places established in 1833